Md. Abu Bakar is a Bangladesh story poem and nobel writer politician and the former Member of Parliament of Comilla-3.

Career 
Bakar was elected to parliament from Comilla-3 as a Bangladesh Jamaat-e-Islami candidate in 2015.

References

Bangladesh Jamaat-e-Islami politicians
5th Jatiya Sangsad members
People from Natore District